Kolappa Kanakasabhapathy Pillay (3 April 1905 – 26 September 1981) was an Indian historian who headed the Department of Indian history at the University of Madras from 1954 to 1966. He also served as a President of the Indian History Congress and as the founder-President of the South Indian History Congress.

Biography 

Pillay was born on 3 April 1905 to Kolappa Pillay and Parvathi, a Tamil-speaking couple in the village of Aloor in the Kalkulam taluk in the Southern division of Travancore state (presently in Kanyakumari district of Tamil Nadu). He was educated at the English High School at Kottar and the Scott Christian College in Nagercoil. After graduating, Pillay worked as a lecturer in Government College, Kumbakonam. Later, he joined the faculty of the Presidency College, Madras as Professor before moving to the University of Madras.

In 1948, Pillay obtained a doctorate from the University of Oxford for his thesis on "Local Self-Government in Madras Presidency, 1850-1919". He also won a D. Litt. in 1953 for his paper "The Suchindram Temple". Pillay headed the Department of Indian History and Archaeology at the University of Madras from 1954 to 1959 and the Department of Indian History from 1959 to 1966. In 1966, Pillay was made head of the newly created Department of Social Sciencies and Area Studies, a position he held till 1971. In 1972, Pillay succeeded K. A. Nilakanta Sastri as the Director of  UNESCO's Institute of Traditional Cultures of South East Asia. Under his stewardship, the institute conducted two conferences one in 1977 and 1978. Pillay died on 26 September 1981 at the age of 76.

Works

References 

1905 births
1981 deaths
Academic staff of the University of Madras
20th-century Indian historians
Dravidologists
People from Kanyakumari district
Scientists from Tamil Nadu